The Bromley Farm–Koizuma Hishinuma Farm is a historic farmstead in the vicinity of Brighton, Colorado, United States.  Established shortly before 1899, it includes a complex of four buildings and multiple other historic structures.  In 2007, the farm was designated a historic district and listed on the National Register of Historic Places because of its historically significant architecture.

It was a home of settler Emmet Ayers Bromley, who came to Colorado in 1877.   Bromley was president of the First National Bank of Brighton and of the Gibraltar Oil Company.  He served in the Colorado House of Representatives and in the Colorado Senate.

See also
National Register of Historic Places listings in Adams County, Colorado

References

Buildings and structures in Adams County, Colorado
Farms on the National Register of Historic Places in Colorado
Historic districts on the National Register of Historic Places in Colorado
Houses completed in 1899
National Register of Historic Places in Adams County, Colorado
1899 establishments in Colorado